Nangooram is a 1979 Indian Tamil-language film directed by Timothy Weeraratne. The film stars R. Muthuraman, Lakshmi and Vijaya Kumaranatunga.

Plot

Cast 
The list was taken from the film titles.

Male cast
Muthuraman as Vinoth
Vijaya Kumaranatunga as Ananth
V. S. Raghavan
Suruli Rajan
Ceylon Manohar
Master Sekar
Thillai Rajan
Madhukumar
Kalaichelvan
M. M. Latiff
Bala

Female cast
Lakshmi as Radha
Fareena Lye
Vasantha
Janita
Sabita

Production 
The film was produced by Lankal Murugesu and was directed by Timothy Weeraratne. Jayakumar wrote the story while the dialogues were penned by Pinnai Panneerselvam. Cinematography was in charge of Timothy Weeraratne while the operative cameramen were V. Suresh and Lalith. Editing was done by B. Kandasamy, A. Ramasamy was in charge of art direction. Still photography was done by Priyalal and Praveenkumar. The film was shot at Sathya and AVM studios and was processed at Prasath Colour lab.

Soundtrack 
The music was composed by V. Kumar and Premasiri Khemadasa. The lyrics were penned by Kannadasan.

Reception 
Kausikan of Kalki felt the film did not have much of a story but praised the songs and cinematography.

References

External links 
 

1970s Tamil-language films
Indian drama films
Films shot in Sri Lanka